Tora Torapa, written and drawn by Fournier, is the twenty-third album of the Spirou et Fantasio series, and the author's fourth, following the Spirou retirement of André Franquin. The story was initially serialised in Spirou magazine before its publication as a hardcover album in 1973.

Story
In Tora Torapa, Spirou, Fantasio, The Count, Itoh Kata and Zorglub are all gathered at Champignac, when The Triangle appears again, this time to kidnap the scientist with a dubious past, Zorglub. The heroes manage to shoot a tracking device into their abducted friend, and eventually trace the movements of the kidnappers to the island of Tora Torapa, in the past the location of an old base used by the Zorglub network. There, Triangle number one Papa Pop (cf. Papa Doc), actually one of Spirou's arch-enemies Zantafio in disguise, is waiting with evil plans for world domination, but which he needs Zorglub to set into effect.

Background
In this album, Ororéa is introduced.

Trivia
Papa Pop's henchman Mac Ravash bears strong resemblance to comics writer and Spirou magazine editor Yvan Delporte.

The album features cameos of two other famous characters in Franco-Belgian comics (also featured in the Spirou magazine); at the airport, airline hostess Natacha is seen leading the boy Benoît Brisefer.

References

 Fournier publications in Spirou BDoubliées 
Footnotes

External links
Spirou official site album index 

Spirou et Fantasio albums
Works originally published in Spirou (magazine)
Literature first published in serial form
1973 books
1973 in comics
Comics set in Oceania